Realme 7 and Realme 7 Pro are dual-SIM smartphones from the Chinese company Realme. They were launched on 10 September 2020. Both of the devices have Gorilla Glass 3 shatter resistant glass.

Specifications

Hardware 
Realme 7 is powered by Mediatek Helio G95 SoC 4G chip that has a octa-core (2x2.05 GHz Cortex-A76 & 6x2.0 GHz Cortex-A55) (12 nm) CPU and the Mali-G76 MC4 GPU. It has a 5000mAh non-removable battery. It supports 30W Dart Charge quick charging. It has three models: 6GB RAM/64GB storage and 8GB RAM/128GB storage. However, the Asian model of the Realme 7 doesn't have the 4GB RAM/64 GB storage model. It supports memory expansion up to 256GB via microSD card slot. It supports a 6.5-inch FHD+ IPS LCD panel with 1080x2400 resolution, 90 Hz refresh rate and 90.5% screen-to-body ratio.

Realme 7 Pro is powered by Qualcomm Snapdragon 720G SoC that has an octa-core (2x2.3 GHz Kryo 465 Gold & 6x1.8 GHz Kryo 465 Silver) CPU and the Adreno 618 GPU. It has a 4500mAh non-removable battery. It supports 65W Super Dart Charge quick charging. The device is available with 6GB or 8GB RAM and 128GB of storage, it supports memory expansion up to 256GB via microSD card slot. It sports a 6.4-inch FHD+ Super AMOLED display with 1080x2400 resolution, 60 Hz refresh rate and 90.8% screen-to-body ratio.

Camera 
Both Realme 7 and Realme 7 Pro are equipped with a quad-camera setup consisting of a 64 megapixel Sony IMX682 main camera with light-sensing ability, 1/1.73" large sensor size, 0.8 qm pixel size, f/1.8 aperture, 26mm focal length, PDAF and Quad Bayer support; an 8 megapixel wide-angle camera with a 119-degree field of view, 1/4.0" sensor size, 1.12 qm pixel size, f/2.3 aperture and 16mm focal length; a 2 megapixel macro camera with f/2,4 aperture, and a 2 megapixel depth camera.  However; in the global model of Realme 7, there is a 48 MP main camera with 1/2.0" sensor size, 0.8 qm pixel size, f/1.8 aperture, 26mm focal length, PDAF and Quad Bayer support.

Software 
Realme 7 and Realme 7 Pro both run on Realme UI based on Android 10.

References

External links 
 Official Website

7
Mobile phones introduced in 2020
Phablets
Mobile phones with multiple rear cameras
Mobile phones with 4K video recording